The Last Phantom is a comic book series published by Dynamite Entertainment, inspired by Lee Falk's The Phantom. It is a modern reboot of the classic character written by Scott Beatty and drawn by Eduardo Ferigato, with covers painted by Alex Ross.

Plot
Kit Walker, the twenty-first in a line of heroes originated in 1536, has forsaken his family legacy of becoming the Phantom, a masked vigilante defending the innocent and tirelessly fighting evil all over the world. Walker has instead chosen to start the charitable organization Walkabout, and has settled down with his wife and his son. When Walker's friend and employee Peter Quisling orchestrates the murder of his family, Kit has no other choice than to take up the mantle of the Phantom once again to avenge his loved ones and bring justice to the world.

Totally, 12 issues and 1 Annual were released, but ended in a cliffhanger with no issues thereafter. The story follows current Phantom as well as his father in flashbacks, both remaining incomplete.

External links
 Official website
 Chronicle Chamber
 The Last Phantom : Legend not Concluded Review at CulturePOPcorn

Dynamite Entertainment titles
The Phantom